Gav Savar may refer to:
 Gav Savar, Hamadan
 Gav Savar, Ilam